Glère is a commune in the Doubs department in the Bourgogne-Franche-Comté Region in eastern France.

Geography
Many of the residents work in the agricultural sector, with dairy farming still forming a large part of the local economy. A number of residents also commute to work in factories in nearby Switzerland.

Population

Sights
Glère hosts a 17th-century church, a post office, two restaurants, and a bar. The village, with its location on the tranquil river Doubs, is a perennial favorite with fishermen and campers.

In the early 1990s, Roger Macabrey, a recipient of the croix de guerre for his actions during World War II and a former mayor of Glère, served on the general council of Doubs department, where he promoted initiatives to attract more tourists to the region.

See also
 Communes of the Doubs department

References

Communes of Doubs